Stéphane Matheu (born 27 April 1973) is a French former professional tennis player.

A left-handed player, Matheu was active on the professional tour in the 1990s and reached a career best singles world ranking of 286. He made his only ATP Tour main draw appearances as a qualifier at the 1994 Dutch Open.

Matheu is now involved in professional poker as a team manager.

ITF Futures titles

Doubles: (3)

References

External links
 
 

1973 births
Living people
French male tennis players